Treubaria is a genus of green algae in the family Treubariaceae.

The genus was circumscribed by Charles Jean Bernard in Protococ. Desmid. Eau Douce 5-6, 12, 169 in 1908.

The genus name of Treubaria is in honour of Melchior Treub (1851–1910), who was a Dutch botanist. He worked at the Bogor Botanical Gardens in Buitenzorg on the island of Java, south of Batavia, Dutch East Indies, gaining renown for his work on tropical flora.

Species
As accepted by WoRMS;
Treubaria crassicornuta 
Treubaria crassispina 
Treubaria planctonica 
Treubaria quadrispina 
Treubaria schmidlei 
Treubaria setigera 
Treubaria triappendiculata 
Treubaria umbrina 

Former species;
 T. euryacantha''''  accepted as Treubaria triappendiculata T. limnetica  accepted as Treubaria schmidlei 
 T. varia  accepted as Treubaria schmidlei''

References

External links

Sphaeropleales genera
Sphaeropleales